Torab (also Romanized as Torāb; also known as Torābābād) is a village in Hoseynabad Rural District, in the Central District of Anar County, Kerman Province, Iran. At the 2006 census, its population was 382, in 99 families.

References 

Populated places in Anar County